The 231-Class Locomotive is a Pacific type metre gauge steam locomotive in use on Vietnam Railways and Cambodia Railways.

References

4-6-2 locomotives
Steam locomotives of Cambodia
Steam locomotives of Vietnam